Leggett's rainbowfish (Glossolepis leggetti)  is a species of rainbowfish in the subfamily Melanotaeniinae. 
It is only found in the Wapoga River system of northern Irian Jaya, Indonesia. This species can reach a length of  SL.

Etymology
This rainbowfish is named in honor of Australian aquarist-naturalist Ray Leggett (b. 1936), because of his contributions to the further knowledge of freshwater fishes in the New Guinea-Australia region.

References

Glossolepis
Taxa named by Gerald R. Allen
Taxa named by Samuel Jafet Renyaan
Fish described in 1998